The 2022–23 UEFA Europa Conference League qualifying phase and play-off round began on 5 July and ended on 25 August 2022.

A total of 166 teams competed in the qualifying system of the 2022–23 UEFA Europa Conference League, which included the qualifying phase and the play-off round, with 25 teams in Champions Path and 141 teams in Main Path. The 22 winners in the play-off round advanced to the group stage, to join the 10 losers of the Europa League play-off round.

Times are CEST (UTC+2), as listed by UEFA (local times, if different, are in parentheses).

Teams

Champions Path

The Champions Path included league champions which were eliminated from the Champions Path qualifying phase of the Champions League and the Champions Path qualifying phase of the Europa League, and consisted of the following rounds:
Second qualifying round (16 teams): 16 teams which entered this round (including 13 losers of the Champions League first qualifying round and 3 losers of the Champions League preliminary qualifying round).
Third qualifying round (10 teams): 8 winners of the second qualifying round and 2 losers of the Champions League first qualifying round which were drawn to receive a bye.
Play-off round (10 teams): 5 teams which entered this round (including 5 losers of the Europa League Champions Path third qualifying round), and 5 winners of the third qualifying round.

Below are the participating teams of the Champions Path (with their 2022 UEFA club coefficients, not to be used as seeding for the Champions Path, however), grouped by their starting rounds.

Notes

Main Path

The Main Path included league non-champions, and consisted of the following rounds:
First qualifying round (60 teams): 60 teams which entered in this round.
Second qualifying round (90 teams): 60 teams which entered in this round, and 30 winners of the first qualifying round.
Third qualifying round (54 teams): nine teams which entered in this round, and 45 winners of the second qualifying round.
Play-off round (34 teams): seven teams which entered this round (including two losers of the Europa League Main Path third qualifying round), and 27 winners of the third qualifying round.

Below are the participating teams of the League Path (with their 2022 UEFA club coefficients), grouped by their starting rounds.

Notes

Format
Each tie was played over two legs, with each team playing one leg at home. The team that scored more goals on aggregate over the two legs advanced to the next round. If the aggregate score was level at the end of normal time of the second leg, extra time was played, and if the same amount of goals were scored by both teams during extra time, the tie was decided by a penalty shoot-out.

Schedule
The schedule of the competition was as follows (all draws were held at the UEFA headquarters in Nyon, Switzerland).

First qualifying round

The draw for the first qualifying round was held on 14 June 2022.

Seeding
A total of 60 teams played in the first qualifying round. Seeding of teams was based on their 2022 UEFA club coefficients. Teams from the same association could not be drawn against each other. Prior to the draw, UEFA formed six groups of five seeded teams and five unseeded teams in accordance with the principles set by the Club Competitions Committee. Numbers were pre-assigned for each team by UEFA. The first team drawn in each tie was the home team of the first leg.

Summary

The first legs were played on 5, 6 and 7 July, and the second legs were played on 12 and 14 July 2022.

The winners of the ties advanced to the Main Path second qualifying round. The losers were eliminated from European competitions for the season.

Matches

Second qualifying round

The draw for the second qualifying round was held on 15 June 2022.

Seeding
A total of 106 teams played in the second qualifying round. They were divided into two paths:
Champions Path (16 teams): The teams, whose identity was not  known at the time of draw, was seeded as following:
Seeded: 13 of the 15 losers of the 2022–23 UEFA Champions League first qualifying round (two of the teams received a bye to the third qualifying round).
Unseeded: 3 losers of the 2022–23 UEFA Champions League preliminary round.
Main Path (90 teams): 60 teams which entered in this round, and 30 winners of the first qualifying round. Seeding of teams was based on their 2022 UEFA club coefficients. For the winner of the first qualifying round, whose identity was not known at the time of draw, the club coefficient of the highest-ranked remaining team in each tie was used. Teams from the same association could not be drawn against each other.

Prior to the draw, UEFA formed three groups in the Champions Path with two groups of five seeded teams and one unseeded team and one group of three seeded teams and one unseeded team and nine groups in the Main Path of five seeded teams and five unseeded teams, in accordance with the principles set by the Club Competitions Committee. In each group of the Champions Path, firstly, a seeded team was drawn against the only unseeded team, and then, the remaining seeded teams were drawn against each other. In the Main Path, numbers were pre-assigned for each team by UEFA, with the draw held in one run for Groups 1–9 with ten teams. The first team drawn in each tie was the home team of the first leg.

On 27 May 2022, the UEFA executive committee decided to prevent teams from Belarus and Ukraine from being drawn against each other in any future UEFA competitions with immediate effect and until further notice due to the Belarusian involvement in the Russian invasion of Ukraine.

Summary

The first legs were played on 19, 20 and 21 July, and the second legs were played on 26, 27 and 28 July 2022.

The winners of the ties advanced to the third qualifying round of their respective path. The losers were eliminated from European competitions for the season.

Matches

Third qualifying round

The draw for the third qualifying round was held on 18 July 2022.

Seeding
A total of 64 teams played in the third qualifying round. They were divided into two paths:
Champions Path (10 teams): eight winners of the second qualifying round (Champions Path), whose identity was not known at the time of the draw, and two losers from the first qualifying round of the Champions League which received a bye to this round. There was no seeding.
Main Path (54 teams): nine teams that entered in this round, and 45 winners of the second qualifying round (Main Path). Seeding of teams was based on their 2022 UEFA club coefficients. For the winners of the second qualifying round, whose identity was not known at the time of draw, the club coefficient of the highest-ranked remaining team in each tie was used. Teams from the same association could not be drawn against each other.
Prior to the draw, UEFA formed two groups in the Champions Path with one group of six teams and one group of four teams and six groups in the Main Path with three groups of four seeded teams and four unseeded teams, and with three groups of five seeded teams and five unseeded teams. in accordance with the principles set by the Club Competitions Committee. In each group of the Champions Path, the teams were drawn into ties without seeding. The first ball drawn designated the home team for the first leg. In the Main Path, numbers were pre-assigned for each team by UEFA, with the draw held in one run for Groups 1–3 with eight teams, and in one run for Groups 4–6 with ten teams. The first team drawn in each tie was the home team of the first leg.

Notes

Summary

The first legs were played on 3 and 4 August, and the second legs were played on 9, 10 and 11 August 2022.

The winners of the ties advanced to the play-off round of their respective path. The losers were eliminated from European competitions for the season.

Matches

Play-off round

The draw for the play-off round was held on 2 August 2022.

Seeding
A total of 44 teams played in the play-off round. They were divided into two paths:
Champions Path (10 teams): The teams, whose identity was not known at the time of the draw, were seeded as follows:
Seeded: five losers of the 2022–23 UEFA Europa League third qualifying round (Champions Path).
Unseeded: five winners of the third qualifying round (Champions Path).
Main Path (34 teams): five teams which entered in this round, 27 winners of the third qualifying round (Main Path), and two losers of the 2022–23 UEFA Europa League third qualifying round (Main Path). Seeding of teams was based on their 2022 UEFA club coefficients. For the winners of the third qualifying round and losers of the Europa League third qualifying round, whose identity was not known at the time of draw, the club coefficient of the highest-ranked remaining team in each tie was used. Teams from the same association could not be drawn against each other.
Prior to the draw, UEFA formed four groups in the Main Path, three of four seeded teams and four unseeded teams, and one of five seeded teams and five unseeded teams, in accordance with the principles set by the Club Competitions Committee. In the Main Path, numbers were pre-assigned for each team by UEFA, with the draw held in two runs, one for Groups 1–3 with eight teams and one for Group 4 with ten teams. The first team drawn in each tie was the home team of the first leg.

Notes

Summary

The first legs were played on 17 and 18 August, and the second legs were played on 23 and 25 August 2022.

The winners of the ties advanced to the group stage. The losers were eliminated from European competitions for the season.

Matches

References

External links

1
July 2022 sports events in Europe
August 2022 sports events in Europe